These are the list of awards and nominations received by South Korean musical art Bolbbalgan4, formed by Shofar Music in 2016 after appearing on Superstar K6 in 2014.


Awards and nominations

Other accolades

Listicles

References 

Bolbbalgan4